Eric Lamone Yarber (born September 22, 1963) is an American football coach and former college player who is currently the wide receivers coach for the Los Angeles Rams of the National Football League (NFL). He played two seasons in the NFL as a wide receiver for the Washington Redskins in 1986 and 1987, which included a win in Super Bowl XXII.

Early years
Born in Chicago, Illinois, Yarber grew up in Southern California in South-Central Los Angeles, and graduated from Crenshaw High School. Though he did not play varsity football in high school due to his size, he played junior college football at Los Angeles Valley College. He transferred to Idaho of the Big Sky Conference in 1984 to play for third-year head coach  Yarber was the conference MVP in his senior season of 1985, and the Vandals won their first league title  Yarber led the Big Sky in receiving with over 1,100 yards and ten touchdowns during the eleven-game regular season. Teammates on the Palouse included quarterback Scott Linehan and offensive lineman Tom Cable, both future NFL head coaches, and lineman 

Yarber was selected in the twelfth round of the 1986 NFL Draft by the Washington Redskins and played two seasons.

Coaching career
Yarber began his coaching career back at Idaho in 1996 as a secondary defensive back coach under second-year head coach Chris Tormey. He was the wide receivers coach at UNLV in 1997.

 Yarber was on Erickson's staff at Oregon State in the Pac-10 Conference. In 1999, he was the running backs coach, and the next year he became the wide receivers coach. He coached Chad Johnson and T. J. Houshmandzadeh during their time with the Beavers. He followed Erickson back to the pros with the San Francisco 49ers, as the receivers coach in 2003 and 2004. Following Erickson's dismissal, Yarber was the receivers coach for the Washington Huskies for two seasons under head coach Tyrone Willingham. In 2007, Yarber became the receivers coach for the Arizona State under Erickson through 2009.

In 2010, Yarber moved back to the NFL for two seasons with as the wide receivers coach for the Tampa Bay Buccaneers. Following a 4–12 record in 2011, Raheem Morris and his staff were fired on January 2, 2012. A week later on January 9, Yarber was named the wide receivers coach for UCLA under new head coach Jim Mora. Yarber won his first championship as coach and second overall after the Rams defeated the Cincinnati Bengals in Super Bowl LVI.

Personal life
Yarber received his bachelor's degree from the University of Idaho in 1995. He was married in June 2005 to his wife Michele and they have two children together, Dawn and Kameryon. He has an older Son Robert Eric Yarber from a previous relationship.

References

External links
 Los Angeles Rams bio
 

1963 births
Living people
American football wide receivers
Washington Redskins players
Idaho Vandals football players
Los Angeles Valley Monarchs football players
Sportspeople from Chicago
Idaho Vandals football coaches
UNLV Rebels football coaches
Seattle Seahawks coaches
Oregon State Beavers football coaches
San Francisco 49ers coaches
Washington Huskies football coaches
Arizona State Sun Devils football coaches
Tampa Bay Buccaneers coaches
UCLA Bruins football coaches
Los Angeles Rams coaches
Players of American football from Los Angeles
Crenshaw High School alumni
Coaches of American football from California
Players of American football from Chicago
Sports coaches from Los Angeles